Maximilian Sciandri (born 15 February 1967) is a retired British road racing cyclist of Italian descent. He competed as an Italian national up to February 1995, then took British citizenship. He won the bronze medal in the men's individual road race at the 1996 Summer Olympics in Atlanta, USA. He was a professional rider from 1989 to 2004. Prior to joining BMC he worked with British Cycling, helping to establish their base in Quarrata, and developing riders such as Mark Cavendish and Geraint Thomas.

Major results

1989
 1st Giro della Romagna
 2nd Giro del Lazio
1990
 Vuelta a Aragón
1st Stages 2, 3a, 4, 5 & 6
 1st Giro della Romagna
 1st Grand Prix Pino Cerami
 3rd Overall Tour de Luxembourg
1991
 1st Stage 11 Giro d'Italia
 3rd Overall Three Days of De Panne
1st Stage 1a
 3rd Overall Settimana Siciliana
1992
 1st  Overall Kellogg's Tour
1st Stage 2
 1st Stage 3 Giro d'Italia
 1st Stage 5 Tour de Romandie
 2nd Paris–Camembert
1993
 1st  Overall Tour de Luxembourg
1st Stages 1 & 2
 1st Giro del Veneto
 1st Grand Prix de Fourmies
 1st Coppa Placci
 1st Stage 2 Settimana Sciliana
 3rd UCI Road World Cup
 3rd Milan–San Remo
 3rd Giro di Lombardia
1994
 1st Stage 16 Giro d'Italia
 1st Stage 4 Giro del Trentino
 2nd Giro del Lazio
1995
 1st Stage 11 Tour de France
 1st Leeds International Classic
 1st Grand Prix de Fourmies
 1st Stage 2 Tirreno–Adriatico
 1st Stage 3a Three Days of De Panne
 7th Clásica de San Sebastián
 8th UCI Road World Cup
 9th Tour of Flanders
1996
 1st Stage 8 Paris–Nice
 2nd Leeds International Classic
 3rd  Road race, Olympic Games
 4th Milan–San Remo
1997
 2nd Paris–Tours
 2nd GP Industria & Artigianato di Larciano
 2nd Gran Premio Industria e Commercio di Prato
 2nd Gran Premio Città di Camaiore
 5th Liège–Bastogne–Liège
 6th Rochester International Classic
 7th UCI Road World Cup
1998
 Critérium du Dauphiné Libéré
1st Stages 1 & 5
 3rd Tre Valli Varesine
 6th Clásica de San Sebastián
1999
 2nd Grand Prix de Fourmies
 8th Clásica de San Sebastián
 8th Coppa Ugo Agostoni
2000
 1st Giro del Lazio
 1st Stage 5 Rapport Tour
2001
 7th Tour of Flanders
 7th Giro di Lombardia

References

External links 

Official Tour de France results for Max Sciandri

1967 births
Living people
British male cyclists
English male cyclists
British Tour de France stage winners
Italian Giro d'Italia stage winners
Cyclists at the 1996 Summer Olympics
Cyclists at the 2000 Summer Olympics
Olympic cyclists of Great Britain
Olympic bronze medallists for Great Britain
Sportspeople from Derby
English people of Italian descent
Italian British sportspeople
Olympic medalists in cycling
Italian male cyclists
Medalists at the 1996 Summer Olympics